Watford West is a disused railway station in Watford, Hertfordshire, United Kingdom on the branch line from  to , last operated in 1996.

History
The station opened in 1912 and was temporarily closed in 1996 before being permanently closed on 23 September 2003, . Facilities at the station had been downgraded in the years prior to closure. At first the station was temporarily closed so the remaining station furniture, including the lampposts, drivers mirrors and the station and street-level signage, was left in situ. By the time clearance work began at the site in preparation for the Croxley Rail Link both mirrors had collapsed and almost all of the station-level signage had disappeared.

The Watford Observer newspaper published an update on 25 January 2017, confirming work had stopped on the Croxley Rail Link because of an ongoing funding issue.

In 2004–05, after the station was mothballed, ten passengers purchased tickets for travel to the station.

Gallery

References

External links
Picture of Watford West station in June 1985 and of the line shortly after closure
Footage of Watford West station filmed in 1990
Pictures of the Croxley Green branch in its disused state (including Watford West)
Pictures of Watford West station when open and in the years after abandonment
Pictures of the Croxley line, including Watford West station, taken in 2009
Croxley Rail Link - official website
TfL - Croxley Rail Link

Disused railway stations in Watford
Former London and North Western Railway stations
Railway stations in Great Britain opened in 1912
Railway stations in Great Britain closed in 1996
1912 establishments in England
1996 disestablishments in England